Luke O'Neill may refer to:

Luke O'Neill (footballer) (born 1991), English footballer
Luke O'Neill (professor), professor of biochemistry